St. Paul the Apostle is a Roman Catholic church in Toronto, Ontario, Canada. It is located at Dundas Street West in The Junction neighbourhood.

The church was primarily built in 1930 by the Maltese-Canadian community of Toronto. A larger, new church was built on the ground by the same community in 1956.

See also
 List of Roman Catholic churches in Toronto

References

Roman Catholic churches in Toronto